The Damara Council was a political party in Damaraland, a Bantustan in South West Africa (now Namibia). In 1977 a breakaway faction joined the Democratic Turnhalle Alliance (DTA), while in 1989, the remainder of the DC was one of 8 political parties which formed the United Democratic Front. 6 of the 8 parties were ethnically affiliated, as they had taken part in the governments of various Bantustans. Since 1989, the UDF has maintained a presence in the National Assembly of Namibia, with Damara-speaking Namibians forming the core of the party.

Prominent members
Prominent members included Frans Migub ǀGoagoseb and Justus ǁGaroëb, both of whom ran other political parties as of the 2009 general election in Namibia.

References

Damara people
Defunct political parties in Namibia
Political parties established in 1971
1971 establishments in South West Africa